Exploris is a public aquarium situated in Portaferry, Northern Ireland. The facility is located on the shores of the Marine Nature reserve of Strangford Lough, which is an important winter migration destination for many wading and sea birds. The lough is home to almost 75% of the marine species found in Northern Ireland, including common seals, basking sharks and brent geese. Three quarters of the world population of pale bellied brent geese spend winter in the lough area. Exploris illustrates and exhibits the large variety of animals that live in Strangford Lough.

Exploris was closed in late 2014 for refurbishment. It reopened in August 2016 following an investment of close to £1.5m in refurbishment works and with the help of Crumlin Road Gaol Ltd, who are the operators.

References

External links
 
 

Aquaria in the United Kingdom
Portaferry
Tourist attractions in County Down
Buildings and structures in County Down